Blake Quick (born 26 February 2000) is an Australian racing cyclist, who currently rides for UCI WorldTeam .

Major results

Road
2018
 2nd Criterium, National Junior Road Championships
2019
 1st Points classification, Tour of Fuzhou
2022
 1st  Road race, National Under-23 Road Championships
2023
 2nd Criterium, National Road Championships
5th Overall Bay Crits

Track
2017
 1st  Omnium, National Junior Track Championships
2018
 UCI Junior World Championships
1st  Madison (with Luke Plapp)
3rd  Team pursuit
3rd  Omnium
 3rd  Madison, National Track Championships
2019
 National Track Championships
2nd  Individual pursuit
3rd  Madison

References

External links 
 

2000 births
Living people
Australian male cyclists
Cyclists from Brisbane